There were initially 16 
Iraqi detainees in Guantanamo.

In 2005, nine Iraqi citizens were held in the United States's Guantanamo Bay detention camps, in Cuba. Eight of them have been repatriated, four as late as 2009.  Among them Abdul Hadi al Iraqi is the last Iraqi citizen in Guantanamo.

References

Lists of Guantanamo Bay detainees by nationality
Iraq–United States relations